Links Air was a British airline selling and operating scheduled regional flights as well as charter services. It formerly operated scheduled flights out of Doncaster Sheffield Airport and public service obligation flights in Wales from Cardiff to Anglesey on behalf of the Welsh Government.

History
The airline was founded by Jon Ibbotson. It began operating under its own name on scheduled flights in April 2014, after previously operating on behalf of Varsity Express and Citywing. For 2015, Norwich was added as a destination from Cardiff before being dropped after less than 2 months, while Belfast flights were cancelled and Isle of Man flights ceased operating on Sunday 14 June.

Until October 2015, the airline held a Type B operating licence issued by the UK Civil Aviation Authority (CAA), authorising the company to operate flights with fewer than 20 passengers and/or weighing less than 10 tonnes, which were operated by its three British Aerospace Jetstream 31 aircraft.

On 21 October 2015 the CAA suspended the airline's operating certificate over safety concerns, stating that, "Safety is always our first priority and we will always take action when necessary to protect the travelling public." The Cardiff-Anglesey route was taken over by North Flying on behalf of Links Air on short notice. The route has since been operated by Van Air Europe and DragonFly Executive Air Charter, before returning to North Flying. Links Air withdrew its service without notice on 22 January 2016, The service was later run by Citywing.

Links Air was liquidated on 1 April 2016.

Destinations

Former destinations
England
Doncaster/Sheffield - Robin Hood Airport Doncaster Sheffield HQ
Norwich - Norwich International Airport

Isle of Man
Ronaldsway - Isle of Man Airport seasonal

Northern Ireland
Belfast - George Best Belfast City Airport

 Wales
Anglesey - Anglesey Airport
Cardiff - Cardiff Airport base

Fleet

Accidents and incidents
On 8 March 2012, a BAe Jetstream 31 of Links Air, operating Manx2 Flight 302 from Leeds-Bradford Airport, United Kingdom to Ronaldsway Airport, Isle of Man, departed the runway on landing at Ronaldsway. The aircraft was substantially damaged when the starboard undercarriage collapsed due to corrosion-induced cracking. There were no injuries amongst the twelve passengers and two crew.
On 15 August 2014, the aircraft involved in the 2012 accident was damaged at Doncaster-Sheffield airport on a flight from Belfast following the failure of the port undercarriage. One passenger was taken to hospital for treatment and the airport was shut until the next day.

See also
 List of defunct airlines of the United Kingdom

References

External links

1983 establishments in England
Airlines established in 1983
Airlines disestablished in 2016
Defunct airlines of the United Kingdom
Companies based in Lincolnshire
Companies based in Doncaster